This is a list of electoral results for the Electoral district of East Fremantle in Western Australian state elections.

Members for East Fremantle

Election results

Elections in the 1900s

Elections in the 1890s

References

Western Australian state electoral results by district